Gore is an unincorporated community in Chattooga County, in the U.S. state of Georgia.

History
An early variant name was "Mt. Hickory". William Gore, the first postmaster, gave the community its present name. A post office was established at Gore in 1884, and remained in operation until it was discontinued in 1953.

References

Unincorporated communities in Chattooga County, Georgia
Unincorporated communities in Georgia (U.S. state)